Cissusa valens, the vigorous cissusa moth, is a species of moth in the family Erebidae. It is found in North America, where it has been recorded from Utah east to Colorado, south to western Texas and west to Arizona.

The wingspan is about 42 mm. Adults have been recorded on wing from March to September.

The larvae feed on Quercus species.

References

Cissusa
Moths described in 1881
Moths of North America